Pagwesese David Parirenyatwa (born August 2, 1950) is a Zimbabwean politician who served in the government of Zimbabwe as Minister of Health from 2013 to 2018. Previously he served as Minister of Health from 2002 to 2009. He is a medical doctor by profession.

Political career
Parirenyatwa served as Deputy Minister of Health and Child Welfare until he was appointed as Minister of Health and Child Welfare in August 2002. He replaced Timothy Stamps, who was ill; Parirenyatwa had already been effectively in charge of the ministry for some time due to Stamps' illness.

Itai Rusike, Executive Director of the Community Working Group on Health (CWGH), said on June 18, 2007, that the unavailability of drinking water and the contamination of available water had increased the number of citizens at risk for waterborne diseases. Many have already suffered from dysentery. The Public Health Act forbids shutting off water for more than two days. Rusike called on Parirenyatwa to use the Public Health Act to make Munacho Mutezo, the Minister of Water Resources and Infrastructural Development, turn on the tap. "If there is an outbreak of diseases now, it is [Parirenyatwa] who would be blamed."

He warned that cholera and malaria pose a serious threat to Zimbabwe on June 21, 2007.

Parirenyatwa was nominated as ZANU-PF's candidate for the House of Assembly seat from Murehwa North in Mashonaland East in the March 2008 parliamentary election. He won the seat with 7,104 votes against 6,468 for the candidate of the Movement for Democratic Change.

After President Robert Mugabe was re-elected in July 2013, Parirenyatwa was appointed as Minister of Health on 10 September 2013. On Friday 7 September 2018, David Parirentatwa was dropped by current president Emmerson Mnangagwa from Cabinet. On 13 September 2018, it was reported that he had been picked up by police for questioning.

Parirenyatwa was put on the United States sanctions list in 2003.

The Parirenyatwa Hospital is named after his father, Tichafa Samuel Parirenyatwa.

References

Living people
Members of the National Assembly of Zimbabwe
1950 births
Government ministers of Zimbabwe
ZANU–PF politicians